Uganda participates in the 2021 Islamic Solidarity Games held in Konya, Turkey from 9 to 18 August 2022, the Games were rescheduled from 20 to 29 August 2021, the event was postponed to be held from 10 to 19 September 2021 in July 2020 by the ISSF because the original dates were coinciding with the 2020 Summer Olympics, which were postponed due to the COVID-19 pandemic. In May 2021, the ISSF postponed the event to August 2022 citing the COVID-19 pandemic situation in the participating countries.

Medalists

Basketball

Men's 3x3 tournament
Group B

Quarterfinal

Women's 3x3 tournament
Group B

Weightlifting 

Results

References

Nations at the 2021 Islamic Solidarity Games
2021
2022 in Ugandan sport